Harrisburg is a city in Lincoln County, South Dakota, United States and is a suburb of Sioux Falls. The population was 6,732 at the 2020 census. The population of the Harrisburg zip code rose from 2,476 in 2000 to 5,906 in 2010. 9,687 in 2020.

History
Before the railroad was built through Lincoln County, a stagecoach brought mail to the Johnson Harris Homestead located on Nine Mile Creek in Dayton Township. Johnson Harris named the post office Harrisburg in honor of himself.

The history of Harrisburg started August 1, 1879, when the first train came rolling through the territory. The train went from Sioux City, Iowa, to Sioux Falls, South Dakota. The post office was moved to the Emory J. Darling Homestead, 1 mile south of what is now Harrisburg. The post office was called Salina in honor of Mrs. Jim Stillwell, an early settler and a highly respected teacher.

Finally in 1890, the depot was moved to its present site. The post office took back its original name and the town of Harrisburg was born.

One of the many early businesses in Harrisburg was the State Bank, circa 1901–1945. The bank's building is still located in its original spot at 101 Railroad Ave. The bank itself was built in 1899 and completely restored in 2006 by its current owner RISE, Inc. is a construction management/structural engineering firm.

Much mystery surrounds the old bank building, including whether or not the infamous bandit John Dillinger stopped to rob it. According to popular legend, after Dillinger robbed the bank, he fired a round into the teller counter as a reminder not to follow him out. That bullet hole remains there today.

Government
The city of Harrisburg is led by a mayor-council (strong mayor) form of government. Mayoral elections occur every four years. City council seats are contested every three years; However, not all of the council members are elected in the same year. The council consists of four members elected to represent two wards. The council member position is designed to be part-time.

Geography
Harrisburg is located at  (43.429366, -96.696113).

Harrisburg has been assigned the ZIP code 57032 and the FIPS place code 27260.

Harrisburg is an estimated 2.7 miles from the southern edge of Sioux Falls metro area.

Demographics

As of the census of 2010, there were 4,089 people, 1,423 households, and 1,133 families residing in the city. The racial makeup of the city was 96.8% White, 0.5% African American, 0.2% Native American, 0.3% Asian, 0.2% from other races, and 2.0% from two or more races. Hispanic or Latino of any race were 1.3% of the population.

There were 1,423 households, of which 53.5% had children under the age of 18 living with them, 65.0% were married couples living together, 10.3% had a female householder with no husband present, 4.3% had a male householder with no wife present, and 20.4% were non-families. 13.3% of all households were made up of individuals, and 1% had someone living alone who was 65 years of age or older. The average household size was 2.87 and the average family size was 3.18.

The median age in the city was 27.1 years. 34% of residents were under the age of 18; 8.2% were between the ages of 18 and 24; 42.6% were from 25 to 44; 13.1% were from 45 to 64; and 2% were 65 years of age or older. The gender makeup of the city was 49.0% male and 51.0% female.

Education
The Harrisburg School District currently has one high school, two middle schools, and seven elementary schools. Due to a mismatch in the boundaries between school districts and cities, some of the schools are in Sioux Falls. There are approximately 4,800 students in the district.

High school
 Harrisburg

Middle schools
 North - in Sioux Falls
 South

Elementary schools
 Adventure
 Endeavor - in Sioux Falls
 Explorer - in Sioux Falls
 Freedom
 Horizon - in Sioux Falls
 Journey - in Sioux Falls
 Liberty

Liberty Elementary and Freedom Elementary are located inside Harrisburg. A new (2008) sports complex and stadium were built at the new high school on the west side of Harrisburg, along with construction of soccer fields and tennis courts on the north side of the Harrisburg High School campus. Harrisburg is in SDHSAA class AA in athletics and would compete with the five other class Sioux Falls metro schools, but those Sioux Falls schools moved up to AAA at the same time.

References

External links
 Official website

Cities in South Dakota
Cities in Lincoln County, South Dakota
Sioux Falls, South Dakota metropolitan area